The New Zealand cricket team toured Sri Lanka for a 2-match Test series and 2 Twenty20 Internationals from 7 August 2009 to 16 September 2009. In addition, New Zealand, Sri Lanka, and India played in a tri-series during this time. Subsequently, Sri Lanka won the series 2–0.

Test series

1st Test

2nd Test

Twenty20 Series

1st T20

2nd T20

Tour Matches

First Class:Sri Lanka Cricket Development XI v New Zealanders

First Class:Sri Lanka Cricket XI v New Zealanders

List A:Sri Lanka A v New Zealanders

List A:Sri Lankan XI v New Zealanders

Media coverage

Television
Arab Digital Distribution (live) – Middle East
Ten Sports (live) – India, Sri Lanka and Pakistan

See also
Tri-Series in Sri Lanka in 2009-10

References

2009 in New Zealand cricket
2009 in Sri Lankan cricket
International cricket competitions in 2009
2009
Sri Lankan cricket seasons from 2000–01